headspace, formally the headspace National Youth Mental Health Foundation, is an Australian non-profit organisation for youth mental health established by the Australian Government in 2006. The project is funded by the Department of Health and Aged Care under the Youth Mental Health Initiative Program, and indirectly supported through the Better Access Scheme.

headspace delivers support to young people aged from 12 to 25 years to reduce the impact of depression, anxiety, stress, alcohol and drug use, and to improve relationship issues associated with sexuality, sexual health, families, and bullying. Young people and their families can get support at a headspace centre as well as online and telephone support service, eheadspace. Many hospitals, especially in metropolitan areas, refer patients that are not a current threat to themselves or others to headspace for longer-term mental health care.

Centres 
headspace has more than 100 centres across Australia which can be accessed for free or at low cost. Staff include doctors, psychologists, social workers, occupational therapists, nurses, youth workers, counsellors and alcohol and drug workers. headspace can help with psychotherapy, counselling, education and employment services, as well as drug and alcohol issues. In some centres, headspace can also provide general health services such as nutritionists and GPs. headspace centre locations can be found on the headspace website.

eheadspace 

eheadspace is confidential and free space where a young person can call, chat or email with a qualified youth mental health professional. Unlike Lifeline or Kids Helpline, eheadspace is not an emergency or crisis service. eheadspace is available 9am – 1am (Melbourne time), 7 days a week.

headspace schools 
headspace School Support ("headspace schools") is an initiative funded by the Department of Health that provides support to secondary schools affected by the suicide of a student. The initiative includes prevention programs (such as "Be You") and suicide-response services. Generally, headspace schools helps to provide support and counselling for witnesses of suicide and members of school communities, including students and staff.

Staff, board and ambassadors 

The Chief Executive Officer of headspace is Jason Trethowan. headspace is directed by the headspace board, chaired by Lisa Paul . Notable roles within headspace's executive team and board include:

 Debra Rickwood (Chief Scientific Advisor and Executive Director Research and Evaluation)
 Julia Smith (Executive Director headspace Services)
 Adam Holmes (Chief Financial Officer)
 Viki Ryall (Executive Director Clinical Practice)
 Professor Patrick McGorry 
 Ms Anne Murphy Cruise
 Dr Annette Carruthers
 Ms Katina Law
 Dr John Harvey
 Robbie Sefton

Ambassadors of headspace include:

 Ruby Rose, TV personality, DJ and Orange Is The New Black actress 
 Dylan Lewis, TV and radio presenter 
 James Mason, Neighbours actor 
 Trent 'Maxi' Maxwell, Bondi Rescue actor
 Gus Johnston, former Victorian Hockey (team) player  
 Simon Hogan, former Geelong AFL player 
 Nick Duigan, former Carlton AFL player 
 Daniel Jackson, former Richmond AFL player 
 Bob Murphy, former Western Bulldogs AFL player  
 Jude Bolton, former Sydney Swans AFL player 
 Heath Black, former Fremantle AFL player
 Campbell Brown, former Hawthorn and Gold Coast Suns AFL Player

See also

Lifeline
ReachOut.com
Beyond Blue
headtohealth.gov.au
suicidecallbackservice.org.au

References

External links
 

Counseling organizations
Mental health organisations in Australia
2006 establishments in Australia
Health charities in Australia